Rytiodus (meaning Rytina, "wrinkled", an old name for Steller's sea cow) is an extinct genus of sirenian, whose fossils have been discovered in France, Europe and Libya.

Description
Like its closest modern relatives, the dugongs, Rytiodus had a pair of flippers, a streamlined body and a tail fin. Its flattened snout allowed it to feed in shallow coastal waters. Rytiodus had short tusks which it may have used to extract food from the sand.

See also 

Evolution of sirenians

References

Barry Cox, Colin Harrison, R.J.G. Savage, and Brian Gardiner. (1999): The Simon & Schuster Encyclopedia of Dinosaurs and Prehistoric Creatures: A Visual Who's Who of Prehistoric Life., Simon & Schuster.
David Norman. (2001): The Big Book Of Dinosaurs. Pg.347-348, Welcome Books.

Miocene sirenians
Miocene mammals of Europe
Miocene mammals of Africa
Prehistoric placental genera